Aayudham is a 2005 Indian Tamil-language action film directed by M. A. Murugesh. It stars Prashanth and Sneha, while Vadivelu, Subbaraju, Rajesh, and Janagaraj play supporting roles. Featuring music composed by Dhina, the film released on 14 January 2005 to mixed reviews from film critics and became an average success.

Plot
Siva is admitted to a medical college in Chennai. His police constable father, gets a transfer to Chennai, as well, so that he can keep an eye on his son. Siva soon develops a liking towards Mahalakshmi, his collegemate. However, Naga, Maha's servant-maid's son and the dreaded don of Chennai city, is obsessed with making Maha his own. It is now upto Siva to rescue Maha and her family from Naga's clutches.

Cast

 Prashanth as Siva
 Sneha as Mahalakshmi
 Vadivelu as Thangapandi
 Subbaraju as Naga
 Rajesh as Siva's father 
 Janagaraj as Naga's uncle
 Mansoor Ali Khan as Minister Andiappan
 Manobala as College Professor
 Santhana Bharathi 
 Kalairani as Maha's House servant
 Ramji as Police
 Thalaivasal Vijay
 Ajay Rathnam
 Singamuthu
 Bonda Mani
 Besant Ravi
 Meenal Pendse special appearance in the "Sarakku Sarakku"

Production
The film was directed by M. A. Murugesh, who had previously directed the film, Indru Mudhal (2003). Sneha was selected to play the lead female role and began work on the film in May 2004. A major portion of the film was shot at Chennai Trade Center at Nandambakkam near Chennai, while 2 songs were filmed in London. The first schedule of the film commenced in Chennai, where a dance number was shot at a lavish set costing Rs 40 lakh at the AVM Studios, where Prashanth and fifty dancers took part. The second schedule of forty days was held at locations in Madurai, Thoothukudi, Tirunelveli, Kanyakumari and Nagercoil. Dance choreographer Dinesh choreographed two dance numbers - one in which Prashanth and Mumbai's Minal took part, the other where he danced with Rasna, a Mumbai model. Fifty girls from the musical, Bombay Dreams, were selected to feature in Sungadi saris during a song shoot at Trafalgar Square.

Release
The film opened to mixed reviews in January 2005 alongside three other Tamil films. Malathi Rangarajan of The Hindu noted that "it's all very fine if you are not looking for anything innovative in the entertainment offered", adding that "Prashanth is too experienced an actor to goof up the role. He plays Siva with ease. And as always he is more at home in action" and that "Sneha makes proper use of the couple of scenes that offer her a little scope to perform." Sify.com noted that film was "below average" and added "The film looks like a poor man’s Ghilli and the story is as old as the hills with no semblance of either style or substance." Visual Dasan of Kalki wrote that Aayudham had taken the single line plot from third rated masala films like Jayam and Ghilli. He said exaggerations are key in such stories, but in Aayudham, the director was very careful to portray every scene in an interesting way and succeeded in it.

The film performed average at the Tamil Nadu box office. The film's release was hampered by the Boxing Day Tsunami which also hit Chennai.

Soundtrack

The film score and the soundtrack were composed by Dhina. The soundtrack was released on 17 December 2004 and received a positive response, with a critic labelling the album as "enjoyable".

References

External links 

2005 films
2005 action films
2000s Tamil-language films
Indian action films
2000s masala films
Films shot in Chennai
Films shot in London
Films shot in Madurai
Films shot in Tirunelveli